Ten Deadly Sins (十宗罪) is a series of six true crime novels written by Chinese author Li Wei Wang (王黎伟) under the pen name "SPIDER".

The series was adapted for TV in 2016.

Crime novel series
Chinese-language novels